"In the Morning" is a song by English indie rock band the Coral. It was released on 9 May 2005 as the lead single from their third studio album The Invisible Invasion (2005). The single reached number six on the UK Singles Chart. It was the second-most-played song on UK radio in 2005.

All songs on the single release (except where noted) were recorded at Monnow Valley Studio, mixed at Moles Studio in Bath by Geoff Barrow, Adrian Utley and Craig Silvey and engineered by Adrian Utley and Steve Davis. Nick Joplin was the assistant mix engineer, and the songs were mastered at Whitfield Street Studios in Central London by Frank Arkwright. Art design was by K. Power.

The music video was directed by Goodtimes.

In June 2014, the song featured in an advert for Tesco.

Track listings
CDM
 "In the Morning" – 2:33 (J. Skelly)
 "Gina Jones" – 3:30 (J. Skelly)
 "The Image of Richard Burton as Crom" – 4:02 (the Coral)
 *Mixed at Adrian Utley's house, Assistant mix engineer: Stuart Matthews, Additional production at Elevator Studios, Liverpool by Matthew Edge
 In the Morning (video)
 *Directed by Goodtimes

CD2 Tracker
 "In the Morning" – 2:33 (J. Skelly)
 "Leeslunchboxbyblueleadandthevelcrounderpants" – 2:56 (Bobby Zeus and the Youngbloods)

7-inch
 "In the Morning" – 2:33 (J. Skelly)
 "Gina Jones" – 3:30 (J. Skelly)

Charts

Weekly charts

Year-end charts

Certifications

References

2005 singles
The Coral songs
2005 songs
Songs written by James Skelly
Deltasonic singles